Sami Gökhan Altıparmak (born 20 April 2001) is a Turkish professional footballer who plays as a midfielder for Süper Lig club Gençlerbirliği.

Club career
On 5 February 2020, Altıparmak signed his first professional contract with Gençlerbirliği. He made his debut with Gençlerbirliği in a 1-0 Süper Lig loss to Denizlispor on 14 March 2020.

References

External links

2001 births
Living people
People from Yenimahalle
Turkish footballers
Gençlerbirliği S.K. footballers
Association football midfielders
Süper Lig players